Salahvarzi (also Romanized as Salāḥvarzī and Salāvarzī) is a village in Honam Rural District, in the Central District of Selseleh County, Lorestan Province, Iran. At the 2006 census, its population was 34, in 7 families.

References 

Towns and villages in Selseleh County